Purchase is a hamlet in the town and village of Harrison, in Westchester County, New York, United States. One myth explains that its name is derived from Harrison's purchase, where John Harrison was to be granted as much land as he could ride in one day. Purchase is home to State University of New York at Purchase and Manhattanville College.

History
In 1967, 200 residents stated support for a plan to incorporate Purchase so corporations could not build in the community. In response, officials from the Town of Harrison put forward plans to try to become a city in an attempt to stop Purchase from seceding from the Town of Harrison.

There are many historic sites located in Purchase. The grave of Revolutionary War General Thomas Thomas is located on the grounds of SUNY Purchase. The grounds that SUNY Purchase now occupies was once Strathglass Farms, a dairy farm. The Quaker Friends Meeting house was founded in the 18th century. The original building fell victim to fire years ago and the present one is an accurate reconstruction. Before the headquarters of Pepsi was built, the Blind Brook Polo Club was located on that site. Amelia Earhart flew her plane from the polo grounds. Many colonial era homes and unspoiled natural woodlands have decreased in the last 30 years due to residential development. The Old Oaks Country Club, originally named 'Hill Crest', is a splendid mansion house built in the late 1880s by millionaire Trenor Luther Park and his wife Julia Catlin Park. Trenor Luther was a Harvard Graduate, who studied law, and a silk merchant. His father, Trenor William Park, funded the Panama Railway, ran for Vice President of the United States in 1864 and was involved with the California Gold Mines. Purchase is also known for being one of the richest areas in the country.

The Reid Hall, Manhattanville College was added to the National Register of Historic Places in 1974.

Economy and business

Mastercard's headquarters, Mastercard International Global Headquarters; PepsiCo; Atlas Air and its subsidiary Polar Air Cargo;, Central National-Gottesman and Teladoc Health are headquartered in Purchase. Pernod Ricard has offices in Purchase.

Lenovo had previously maintained its U.S. headquarters in Purchase. In 2006, the company announced it was moving to Morrisville, North Carolina.

The average household income in Purchase is estimated to be approximately $352,000. 

According to Bloomberg, the Zip Code 10577 which is located in Purchase is currently ranked as the fifth wealthiest zip code in the United States.

The hamlet "was used to film a sizeable chunk of the second season" of The Sinner in summer 2018; one featured location is the Cobble Stone Restaurant.

Education

Public schools
Purchase School is the local K–5 elementary school, which is part of the Harrison Central School District. Harrison High School is the local high school, which offers the IB Diploma Programme, and which is the only high school operated by the Harrison Central School District. Harrison High School also serves the entire area of the Town of Harrison, including the Village of Harrison, which is economically diverse. In 2010, Superintendent of the Harrison Central School District, Louis N. Wool was named Superintendent of the Year in New York State.

Private schools
Keio Academy of New York, a Japanese international boarding school, is in Purchase.

Colleges and universities
Purchase is home to the State University of New York at Purchase and Manhattanville College, as well as the Westchester Campus of Fordham University, a private liberal arts college. Keio University also operates a high school named Keio Academy of New York.

Media and culture
Purchase is known for the Purchase Community House (PCH), home of the Purchase Day Camp (PDC). It also runs after-school activities during the rest of the year. On the PCH property, there are four pools and numerous playing fields. The Purchase Free Library is also located on the PCH property.

The Donald M. Kendall Sculpture Gardens at the PepsiCo headquarters and the Neuberger Museum of Art at Purchase College are two significant art collections found in the community.

During the 1980s, the city hosted the festival Pepsico Summerfare, known for their opera productions which included Benjamin Britten's Noye's Fludde (1981–84), David Eaton's The Cry of Clytaemnestra (1982), and Peter Sellars's Little Mahagonny/Cantata 60: Conversations with Fear and Hope After Death (1985), Peter Sellars's productions of Mozart's Così fan tutte (1986), Don Giovanni (1987) and Le nozze di Figaro (1988). Now, SUNY produces two operas each year.

Notable people

Hassan Abbas, scholar and academic
Skylar Brandt, ballet dancer
Kenneth Cole, designer
Eddy Curry, former NBA player
James Badge Dale, actor
Joe Girardi, former MLB player and manager
Sunny Hostin, lawyer and TV host
Alfred A. Knopf Sr., book publisher
Indra Nooyi, business executive
Scott Shannon, radio disc jockey
Sy Sternberg, business executive
Herman Tarnower, cardiologist, author, and murder victim

See also

References

External links

Harrison, New York
Hamlets in Westchester County, New York
Hamlets in New York (state)